The Slacker is a 1917 American silent drama film directed by Christy Cabanne and starring Emily Stevens. It was produced and distributed by Metro Pictures.

A popular film with the U.S. Army causing a spike in Army recruitment just after the US entry into World War I.

Cast
Emily Stevens as Margaret Christy
Walter Miller as Robert Wallace
Leo Delaney as John Harding
Daniel Jarrett as Henry Wallace
Eugene Borden as George Wallace
Millicent Fisher as Virginia Lambert
Sue Balfour as Mrs. Christy
Mathilde Brundage as Mrs. McAllister
Ivy Ward as Child with Flag (credited as Baby Ivy Ward)
Charles Fang as Valet
Belle Bruce - ?
Dorothy Haydel - ?
W. E. Lawrence - ?
Gilbert P. Hamilton - ?
Evelyn Converse - ?

Preservation
The film is preserved by MGM with possible deposit at George Eastman House.

References

External links
 

1917 films
American silent feature films
Films directed by Christy Cabanne
Metro Pictures films
American black-and-white films
Silent American drama films
1917 drama films
1910s American films